Harvey Terrence Gana Bautista, better known as Harvey Bautista, is a Filipino actor. He is the son of former Quezon City Mayor Herbert Bautista.

Background
Harvey Bautista was born on August 16, 2003 in Quezon City, Philippines.

He has been a part of the ABS-CBN's children gag show, Goin' Bulilit, since year 2011.

Filmography

Television

Film

Accolades

Awards and nominations

References

External links

 Harvey Gana Bautista-Goin Bulilit on Facebook

2003 births
Living people
ABS-CBN personalities
Filipino male child actors
Star Magic